"In Translation" may refer to:

 "...In Translation", an episode of Lost
 "In Translation", an award-winning short story by Lisa Tuttle